Kooyman Peak is a peak rising to , on the ridge just south of Dorrer Glacier in the Queen Elizabeth Range, Antarctica. It was mapped by the United States Geological Survey from tellurometer surveys and Navy air photos, 1960–62, and was named by the Advisory Committee on Antarctic Names for Gerald L. Kooyman, a United States Antarctic Research Program biologist at McMurdo Station in the 1961–62, 1963–64 and 1964–65 seasons.

References

Mountains of the Ross Dependency
Shackleton Coast